Lewis McDonald Thom (10 April 1944 – 28 June 2019) was a Scottish footballer who played as a left winger.

Career
Thom began his professional career in 1961 with Aberdeen and made thirty-five league appearances for the Dons during his three years at Pittodrie. In 1964, Thom moved to Dundee United but left within a year to join Shrewsbury Town, after making less than a dozen league appearances. Thom was a regular during his short time with Shrewsbury and played nearly fifty league games before moving to Lincoln City in 1966, where he remained for three seasons. Thom wrapped up his career with periods at Bradford Park Avenue, Altrincham F.C, and Elgin City, then a Scottish Highland Football League Club, in the early 1970s. Lewis's brother, Hugh, was also a successful footballer in the Highland League with Elgin City.

After football
After his retirement from football, Thom was a well-respected amateur golfer until losing a leg in an accident while working offshore in the oil industry. He died in Aberdeen on 28 June 2019.

References

External links

1944 births
2019 deaths
Aberdeen F.C. players
Altrincham F.C. players
Bradford (Park Avenue) A.F.C. players
Dundee United F.C. players
Lincoln City F.C. players
Scottish Football League players
Scottish footballers
Shrewsbury Town F.C. players
English Football League players
Association football wingers
People from Stornoway
Highland Football League players
Sportspeople from Scottish islands